Richard Nicholas Paul Smyth (born 27 June 1950) is a former English cricketer. Smyth was a right-handed batsman. He was born at Chichester, Sussex, and was educated at Brighton College.

Smyth made his first-class debut for Sussex against Surrey in 1970 County Championship. He made two further first-class appearances for the county, both which came in 1970 against Worcestershire and a tour match against the visiting Jamaicans. In his three first-class appearances, he scored a total of 42 runs at an average of 8.40, with a high score of 25. Smyth made a single List A appearance in that season against Worcestershire in the John Player League, ending Sussex's innings unbeaten on 4, with Worcestershire winning the match by 4 wickets.

References

External links
Richard Smyth at ESPNcricinfo
Richard Smyth at CricketArchive

1950 births
Living people
Sportspeople from Chichester
People educated at Brighton College
English cricketers
Sussex cricketers